Lin Chi-ling (born 29 November 1974) is a Taiwanese model, actress, singer and television host.

Early life
Lin Chi-ling was born on 29 November 1974 in Taipei, Taiwan. Lin's father, Lin Fan-nan, and her mother, Wu Tzu-mei, are both from Tainan in southern Taiwan. Following their marriage, they moved to Taipei where Lin and her elder brother Lin Chi-hong were born. Lin attended Taipei Municipal Zhongzheng Junior High School and at the age of 15 was discovered by model talent scout Lin Chien-huan. She later attended Bishop Strachan School in Toronto, Ontario, Canada, then attended the University of Toronto until 1997, when she completed her bachelor degree, double-majoring in Western art history and economics.

After graduating from university, Lin returned to Taiwan. She intended to pursue a career in fine art and sought a position at the Taipei Fine Arts Museum, but was turned away because she lacked a postgraduate degree in the field. Lin continued to model part-time before leaving the industry and working as an administrative assistant for the Fubon Cultural and Educational Foundation (富邦文教基金會).  In 2000, Lin left Fubon and spent three months studying in Japan, then returned to Taiwan and modeling, with Catwalk Production House.

Career

Modeling 

In 2002, Lin was invited to model in a television advertisement in Hong Kong.  The advertisement received attention and discussion on the internet, and interest in Lin began to grow. The following year, noted television producer Ge Hongfu offered Lin a position as hostess of a fashion program on Shanghai Oriental Television.  In 2004, Lin starred in a broad series of advertisements in Taiwan that included big giant building-size posters, billboards, and television commercials.  Almost overnight, Lin skyrocketed to national fame and became an instant celebrity model.  Her rise to fame initiated a Taiwanese craze for supermodels, an effect commentators named "The Lin Chi-ling Phenomenon".

Lin's popularity grew throughout the rest of 2004, as she began modeling in Hong Kong and Mainland Chinese advertisements, and continued when she began doing Japanese advertisements in 2005. From 2004 to 2006, Lin served as Taiwan's goodwill ambassador to the Japan Tourism Association. One of the unintended results of Lin Chi-ling phenomenon is that due to Lin's popularity among her Chinese fans, some Japanese pornographic actresses resembling Lin have become more famous and more popular among Chinese fans than their native homeland Japan, and received nicknames given by their China fans in association with Lin Chi-ling, such as in the case of Yui Hatano, who is frequently referred by Chinese fans as AV Lin Chi-ling, and Nozomi Aso (麻生希/あそう のぞみ), who is frequently referred by Chinese fans as AV little Lin Chin-ling. On 8 August 2005, Lin was in Dalian, China, shooting an advertisement for Procter & Gamble home products when she fell from the back of a horse she was riding and was inadvertently trampled.  Workers rushed Lin to a nearby hospital where doctors discovered that she had suffered six broken ribs, a punctured left lung, and an accumulation of blood in the pleural cavity. Lin underwent four months of treatment and therapy, and announced in November 2005 that she had completely recovered.

Television
Lin has had numerous roles in television over her time as a model, being the host of TVBS-G LA Mode News, TVBS-G Fashion Track, the Golden Melody Awards and the Top Chinese Music Chart Awards in 2005.

Lin starred as one of the three female leads in the 2010 Fuji TV Japanese television drama Tsuki no Koibito. The male lead is a popular actor Takuya Kimura.

Film 
Lin made her film début role in a historical epic directed by John Woo entitled Red Cliff. Playing the role of Xiaoqiao, it was her first time acting. In 2009, she starred together with Jay Chou in the action-adventure film The Treasure Hunter.

Earnings

As of 2006, Lin has served as an official spokesperson for both China Airlines and Longines.

Taiwanese media reported Lin as #1 model in the "Richest Celebrities [in Taiwan]" list in 2007, with estimated earnings of NT$60,000,000 (≈ AU$2,100,000 ≈ CA$1,900,000 ≈ UK£906,000 ≈ US$1,900,000), in which Jay Chou appeared as #1 male singer (with over NT$100,000,000) and Jolin Tsai appeared as #1 female singer (with nearly NT$100,000,000).

Hong Kong press reported she was 2009's #1 highest-paid model in the Greater China region, followed by Chinese Jennifer Du (#2), Hong Kong's Gaile Lai (#3) and Lynn Hung (#4). She has continuously ranked #1 on Taiwan's "Highest-earning models" list since 2004. Her earnings was estimated to be NT$160,000,000 (≈ AU$5,400,000 ≈ CA$5,400,000 ≈ UK£3,370,000 ≈ US$5,320,000) in 2010, which consisted of those from advertisements (NT$120,000,000) and various such as TV-series appearance in Japan (NT$40,000,000), and NT$200,000,000 (≈ AU$6,600,000 ≈ CA$6,800,000 ≈ UK£4,240,000 ≈ US$6,600,000) in 2011.

In the same year, she established a charity fund Chiling Charity Foundation, which supports child welfare.

Personal life 
Lin was in an on and off relationship with Taiwanese actor Jerry Yan for many years. Yan admitted to reuniting with Lin on 10 November 2017, but this was neither confirmed nor denied by Lin. Around one year later, however, Yan refused to comment and Lin denied dating. On 6 June 2019, Lin announced her marriage to Akira, a member of the Japanese pop band Exile. Lin announced the birth of her first child, a son, on 31 January 2022, after undergoing fertility treatments.

Filmography

Discography

Singles
"Fly Away" (2009) - written by Jay Chou and Lin Chi-ling
"The Power of Beauty" (2010)
"Me and The Moon" (2015)
"You and me" (2018)

Awards
 "International Artist Credibility Award", 2nd International Television Commercial Arts Festival in 2006
 "Hong Kong Style Icons", Hong Kong Trade Development Council in 2006
 "Top Ten China Beauty", 5th International Beauty Week in 2006
 "Best Fashion Icon at the 2nd Entertainment Award at Beijing in 2007
 "Most popular New Actress", Baidu Award in 2008
 "Best New Actress", Sina Award in 2008
 "Best Asia Star Award", Asia Model Awards at Korea in 2009
 "Most Influential Charity Icon", Charity Star Award in 2009
 "2017 University College Alumni of Influence Award", University of Toronto at Canada in 2017

References

External links

 

 
Lin Chi-ling at Chinesemov.com
Lin Chi-ling at Catwalk Production House Official Website
Lin Chi-ling Official Website in Japan avex.jp
Chiling Charity Foundation 

1974 births
Living people
21st-century Taiwanese actresses
Actresses from Taipei
Taiwanese expatriates in Canada
Taiwanese expatriates in Japan
Taiwanese female models
Taiwanese film actresses
University of Toronto alumni